Lott Russell Herrick (December 8, 1871 – September 18, 1937) was an American lawyer and jurist.

Born in Farmer City, Illinois, Herrick graduated from Farmer City High School in 1888. He then graduated from University of Illinois in 1892 and the University of Michigan Law School in 1894. He then practiced law with his father and later with his brother in Farmer City, Illinois. From 1902 to 1904, Herrick served as county judge of DeWitt County, Illinois. He also served as president of the Board of Education of the Moore Township High School. From 1933 until his death in 1937, Herrick served on the Illinois Supreme Court. Herrick died in Rochester, Minnesota at the Mayo Clinic from brain lesions. He was buried in Farmer City, Illinois.

Notes

1871 births
1937 deaths
People from Farmer City, Illinois
University of Illinois alumni
University of Michigan Law School alumni
School board members in Illinois
Illinois state court judges
Justices of the Illinois Supreme Court
Neurological disease deaths in Minnesota
Chief Justices of the Illinois Supreme Court